The 2018–19 Minnesota Golden Gophers men's basketball team represented the University of Minnesota in the 2018–19 NCAA Division I men's basketball season. The Gophers, led by sixth-year head coach Richard Pitino, played their home games at Williams Arena in Minneapolis, Minnesota as members of the Big Ten Conference. The team was led by 2019 First team All-Big Ten selection Jordan Murphy and third team selection Amir Coffey.  They finished the season 22-14, 9-11 in Big Ten Play to finish in 7th place. They defeated Penn State and Purdue to advance to the semifinals of the Big Ten tournament where they lost to Michigan. They received an at-large bid to the NCAA tournament where they defeated Louisville in the First Round before losing in the Second Round to Michigan State.

Previous season
The Golden Gophers finished the 2017–18 season 15–17, 4–14 in Big Ten play to finish in a three-way tie for 11th place. As the No. 11 seed in the Big Ten tournament, they lost in the first round to Rutgers.

Offseason

Departures

Incoming transfers

2018 recruiting class

Roster

Schedule and results
The 2018–19 season will mark the first time in Big Ten history that the teams will play a 20-game conference schedule, setting a precedent for all Division I basketball. The new schedule will also include a regional component to increase the frequency of gamesamong teams in similar areas. Over the course of a six-year cycle (12 playing opportunities), in-state rivals will play each other 12 times, regional opponents will play 10 times, and all other teams will play nine times. Three in-state series will be guaranteed home-and-homes: Illinois and Northwestern, Indiana and Purdue, and Michigan and Michigan State will always play twice.

|-
! colspan=9 style=|Exhibition

|-
! colspan=9 style=|Regular season

|-
! colspan="9" style=|Big Ten tournament

|-
! colspan="9" style=|NCAA tournament

Rankings

*AP does not release post-NCAA tournament rankings

References

2018-19 team
2018–19 Big Ten Conference men's basketball season
2018 in sports in Minnesota
2019 in sports in Minnesota
2019 NCAA Division I men's basketball tournament participants